Johannes Cornelis Hendrik de Meijere  (1 April 1866, Deventer –  6 November 1947) was a Dutch zoologist and  entomologist who specialised in Diptera and Coleoptera.

Prof. dr. Johannes Cornelis Hendrik de Meijere  was Rector Magnificus at the Universiteit van Amsterdam.

Works

Over de haren der zoogdieren: in 't bijzonder over hunne wijze van rangschikking. Leiden, 1933 (proefschrift).
[co-auteur] Nieuwe naamlijst van Nederlandsche Diptera. 's-Gravenhage, 1898.
Die Echinoidea der Siboga-Expedition. Leiden, 1904.
Over het belang van academisch onderwijs in de entomologie. Amsterdam, 1906.
Studien über sudostasiatische Dipteren. 16 delen. 's-Gravenhage, [1907–1924].
De studie der insecten-biologie. Haarlem, 1908.
1908, Studien über südostasiatische Dipteren, Tijdschrift voor Entomologie, 51, 105-180
1908, Zwei neue Strepsiptera aus Java, Tijdschrift voor Entomologie, 51 185-190
1908, Studien über südostasiatischen Dipteren. III, Tijdschrift voor Entomologie, 51, 191-332
Veranderlijkheid in eenheid. Amsterdam, 1929 (Rede 297e herdenking stichtingsdag Universiteit van Amsterdam).
Verslag van de lotgevallen der Universiteit van Amsterdam gedurende den cursus 1928–1929. Amsterdam, 1929 (Rede bij de overdracht van het rectoraat op den 16en September 1929).
Inleiding tot de kennis van de Nederlansche tweevleugelige insecten (Diptera). Zutphen, 1944.

References

Barendrecht, G. and Krüsemann, G., 1949 [de Meijere, J. C. H.] Tijdschr. Ent., Amsterdam 90[1946] : 1–15
Huijbregts, H., 1999 [Meijere, J. C. H. de] Everts, Info 43, Suppl. 47
Lempke, B. J., 1948 [de Meijere, J. C. H.]  Ent. Ber., Berlin 12 (279): 201
Prof. dr. J.C.H. de Meijere, 1866 – 1947 at the University of Amsterdam Album Academicum website

1866 births
1947 deaths
Dutch entomologists
Dipterists
Academic staff of the University of Amsterdam
University of Amsterdam alumni
People from Deventer
Knights of the Order of the Netherlands Lion
Officers of the Order of Orange-Nassau